Gospel Road: A Story of Jesus is a 1973 American drama film directed by Robert Elfstrom and written by Johnny Cash and Larry Murray. The film stars Johnny Cash, Robert Elfstrom, June Carter Cash, Larry Lee, Paul L. Smith and Alan Dater. The film was released on March 31, 1973, by 20th Century Fox.

Plot
The movie depicts the story of Jesus, from life to death with resurrection on location in Israel, as narrated (and sung) by Cash.

Cast  
Johnny Cash as himself
Robert Elfstrom as Jesus Christ
June Carter Cash as Mary Magdalene
Larry Lee as John the Baptist
Paul L. Smith as Peter 
Alan Dater as Nicodemus
Robert Elfstrom Jr. as young Jesus
Gelles LaBlanc as John
Terrence Winston Mannock as Matthew
Thomas Leventhal as Judas Iscariot
John Paul Kay as James the Elder
Sean Armstrong as Thomas
Lyle Nicholson as Andrew
Steven Chernoff as Philip
Stuart Stark as Nathaniel
Ulf Pollack as Thaddeus
Jonathan Sanders as Simon

References

External links
 

1973 films
American drama films
1973 drama films
20th Century Fox films
1970s English-language films
1970s American films